Émile Roger Thomas de Barbarin (4 June 1860 – 4 March 1925) was a French sport shooter who competed in the late 19th century and early 20th century in trap shooting. He participated in Shooting at the 1900 Summer Olympics in Paris and won the gold medal in the trap competition. de Barbarin was born in Paris, where he also died.

References

External links

Roger de Barbarin's profile at databaseOlympics

1860 births
1925 deaths
French male sport shooters
Trap and double trap shooters
Olympic shooters of France
Shooters at the 1900 Summer Olympics
Olympic gold medalists for France
Sport shooters from Paris
Olympic medalists in shooting
Medalists at the 1900 Summer Olympics